Michel Sergent (born December 27, 1943 in Desvres) is a former member of the Senate of France who represented the Pas-de-Calais department from 1992 to 2011. He is a member of the Socialist Party.

References
Page on the Senate website

1943 births
Living people
French Senators of the Fifth Republic
Socialist Party (France) politicians
Senators of Pas-de-Calais
People from Pas-de-Calais